Matthew Kang is a Canadian television journalist and video producer for Forbes Magazine. He was previously a reporter for CBC News with CBC Radio One.

Career

Deutsche Welle

Kang began his career at Deutsche Welle as a radio anchor and reporter in Bonn, Germany, where he reported on various world news events focusing on Germany and the European Union.

CTV

Kang joined CTV's Kitchener affiliate CKCO-DT as a general assignment reporter, he also reported for various CTV News Platforms including BNN, CTV News Channel and CTV National News. During his time there, he landed various high-profile interviews which included actor, Martin Sheen, Olympic athlete Clara Hughes and former CTV National News Anchor Lloyd Robertson.

CBC

Kang joined CBC News in 2013, he served as a local reporter for CBC Radio One Kitchener-Waterloo's affiliate CBLA FM. He covered stories on new product launches by BlackBerry, he recently covered the live Toronto launch of the Blackberry Passport and the launch of its new app 'Blackberry Blend'.

Kang has also covered the release of the Blackberry Classic.

Forbes Magazine

Kang joined Forbes Magazine in January 2016, based in San Francisco, California, he primarily covers stories on the technology industry.

Awards 

Kang was awarded with a RTDNA Canada (Adrienne Clarkson Award - Diversity) in 2012 for his story on the challenges local police services face in attracting minorities, women and members of the LGBT community to joining their services as recruits.

Personal life

References

Living people
Year of birth missing (living people)
Canadian television reporters and correspondents
CBC Television people
People from London, Ontario